Amargosa is the Spanish name of the plant Centaurium erythraea. It may also refer to:

Western United States

Animals
Amargosa toad
Amargosa vole

Natural geography
Amargosa Desert
Amargosa Range
Amargosa River
Amargosa River Area of Critical Environmental Concern and Wild and Scenic River
Amargosa Valley
Amargosa Pupfish Station, Nevada

Populated places and buildings
Amargosa Valley, Nevada, a community within the Amargosa Desert/Valley
 Death Valley Junction, California, formerly named Amargosa
Amargosa Opera House and Hotel in Death Valley Junction, California

Brazil
Amargosa, Brazil
Roman Catholic Diocese of Amargosa, in Brazil